The Distinctive International Arab Festivals Awards (DIAFA) is an annual awards show held in Dubai, UAE. It honors distinguished  International and Arab personalities in recognition of their annual  achievements and contribution towards committees and society  betterment. The first edition of DIAFA was held in 2017.

Winners
The winners' professions and countries of origin are selected by diafa.org.

2017
The 1st edition of DIAFA was held in January 2017.
Abdul Hamid Juma - DIFF, 
Ali Al Khawar - Poet, 
Elissa - Singer, 
Majid Al Mohandis - Singer, 
Fadia Al Taweel - Journalist, 
Abed Fahed - Actor, 
Latifa - Singer, 
Youssra - Actress, 
Khaled Youssef - Director, 
Mohamed Saeed Harib - Director, 
Nurgül Yeşilçay - Actress, 
Rima Njeim - Presenter, 
Habib Ghloom - Actor, 
Zaha Hadid - Artichect, 
Khaled - Singer,

2018
The 2nd edition of DIAFA was held in January 2018.
Wael Kfoury – Singer, 
Elçin Sangu – Actress, 
Hayat Al-Fahad – Actress, 
Bassel Khaiat – Actor, 
B. R. Shetty – Businessman, 
Omar Kamal – Singer, 
Dorra Zarrouk – Actress, 
Irina Bokova – Former director general of UNESCO, 
Arina Domski – Opera singer, 
Mattar Bin Lahej – Sculptor, 
Fayez Al Saeed – Singer and composer, 
Turki Aldakhil – journalist, 
Waleed Nassif – Director, 
Raha Moharrak – Sportwoman, 
ABU – Star of the Year – Singer,

2019
The 3rd edition of DIAFA was held in February 2019.

Dareen Barbar and Arz Zahreddine – Athletes, 
Ali F. Mostafa – Director, 
Samira Said – Singer, 
SABREEN – Actress, 
Sirusho – Singer, 
Engin Altan Düzyatan – Actor, 
Haifa Hussein – Actress, 
Medhat El Adl – Actor, writer and poet, 
RedOne – Singer and composer, 
Cyrine Abdelnour – Actress, 
Saber Rebaï – Singer, 
Mahira Khan – Actress, 
Haya Abdulsalam – Actress, 
Ayman Zeidan – Actor, 
Nelly Karim – Actress, 
Mike Angelo – Singer and actor, 
Wafa Bin Khalifa – Humanitarian, 
Huda Riyami – Painter,

2020
The 4th edition of DIAFA was held in November 2020 during COVID-19 while respecting all the safety measurements and resulting in zero infections among all the attendees. 
UNHCR - UN entity, 
Sheikha Alyaziya Bint Nahyan Al Nahyan - Director, 
Mustafa Agha - Journalist, 
Song Yinxi - Director, 
Abdul Mohsen Al Nemr - Actor, 
Diana Haddad - Singer, 
Latifa - Singer, 
Maxim Khalil - Actor, 
Amjad Abu Ala - Director, 
Laila Aziz - Fashion designer, 
Yara- Singer, 
Sajal Ahad Mir - Actress, 
Mohamed Ramadan (actor and singer) - Actor, 
Ammar Omar - Businessman, 
Michele Morrone - Actor & Singer, 
Elseed - Street artist, 
Mansoor Elfeeli - Actor, 
Fatma Al Hachemi - Singer, 
Mustapha Al Abdallah - Singer, 
Saudi German Hospital - Medical sector, 
Gims - Singer, 
Iveta Mukuchian - Singer,

2021
The 5th edition of DIAFA was held on November 28, 2021, kicking off the celebration of the UAE's 50th anniversary.
H.E. Dr. Mohamed Saeed Al Kindi - UAE Former Minister of Environment and Water, 
Radwa El Sherbiny - Journalist, 
Neslihan Atagül - Actress, 
Nahla Al Fahad - Director, 
Magda Zaki - Actor, 
Nawal El Zoghbi - Singer, 
Angham - Singer, 
Saif Nabeel - Singer, 
Yasser Al Qahtani - Athlete, 
Khalid Al Razooqi - UAE Police Officer, 
Iyad Al Rimawi- Musician, 
Laila Eloui - Actress, 
Lojain Omran - Journalist, 
Jamila Saadouni - Businesswoman, 
Melhem Zein -  Singer, 
Dr. Parween Habib - Journalist & Author, 
Elham El Fadhalah - Actor, 
Antonio Signorini - Sculptor,

References

External links
 

Awards established in 2017
2017 establishments in the United Arab Emirates